The Brad Hornung Trophy is awarded annually to the most sportsmanlike player of the Western Hockey League. First presented in 1967, it was later renamed in honour of former Regina Pats player Brad Hornung who was paralyzed during a game on March 1, 1987.

Previously, the Frank Boucher Memorial Trophy. Frank Boucher was Commissioner of the league for its first two seasons. Boucher spent 29 years with the New York Rangers of the National Hockey League as a player, coach, and General Manager winning three Stanley Cups. He was awarded the NHL’s equivalent trophy the Lady Byng seven times in eight years and was inducted into the Hockey Hall of Fame in 1958.

List of winners

Blue background denotes also named CHL Sportsman of the Year
1The WHL handed out separate awards for the East and West divisions.

See also
CHL Sportsman of the Year
William Hanley Trophy - Ontario Hockey League Sportsman of the Year
Frank J. Selke Memorial Trophy - Quebec Major Junior Hockey League Sportsman of the Year

References

Western Hockey League trophies and awards